Harnish Creek is a meltwater stream,  long, that flows north from the unnamed glacier east of Crescent Glacier into the east part of Lake Fryxell, Taylor Valley, in Victoria Land, Antarctica. The name was suggested by hydrologist Diane McKnight, leader of a United States Geological Survey (USGS) team that made extensive studies of the hydrology and geochemistry of streams and ponds in the Lake Fryxell basin, 1987–94. The creek is named after USGS hydrologist Richard A. Harnish, a member of the field team in the 1988–89 and 1990–91 seasons; during the latter season he assisted in establishing stream gaging stations on streams flowing into Lake Fryxell.

References

Rivers of Victoria Land
McMurdo Dry Valleys